Westmoreland was a ship launched at Whithaven in 1808 as a West Indiaman. She was lost on 5 December 1822.

Career
Westmoreland first appeared in Lloyd's Register (LR) in 1809.

Fate
Westmoreland, Majoribanks, master, was wrecked on 5 December 1822 in the Caicos Islands. Her crew and a small part of her materials were rescued. She was on a voyage from Quebec City to Jamaica. LR for 1824 carried the annotation "lost" by her name.

Citations

1808 ships
Age of Sail merchant ships of England
Maritime incidents in December 1822